Gunnar Todd Rohrbacher (born May 4, 1968) is an American acting coach, writer, director, producer, actor and comedian. He founded Actors Comedy Studio in Los Angeles, California and is a staff writer for Backstage West. He is a graduate of the Warner Bros. Comedy Writer’s Program and is featured in Judy Kerr's Hollywood Survival Guide: Acting is Everything.

Career
Rohrbacher is an alumnus of the ACME Comedy Theater in Hollywood, California, where he was a member of the main company. As a faculty member, he taught all levels of improv, created the sketch writing courses, and directed the school’s performance labs.

In 2011, he opened Actors Comedy Studio with Lauren Marie Bertoni. The studio was created as a counterpoint to the improv and sketch comedy programs that have proliferated in Hollywood. ACS focuses on acting for sitcoms and on-camera audition techniques.

Rohrbacher designed and taught the Acting for Animators program for Disney Animation Studios. He was a character consultant on two of Disney's feature films, Meet the Robinsons and Bolt. He consulted for Klasky Csupo Animation Studios. He also wrote animation for DreamWorks and Sony Animation’s Mega Babies.

As an actor, Rohrbacher starred in two pilots for NBC: Prime Time Comedy, produced by George Schlatter, and the semi-improvised sitcom The Weekend. He also appeared in Boutonniere, starring Zachary Quinto and Wendy McLendon-Covey. The boutonniere was the 2009 24FPS International Short Film Festival Silver Medal winner.

Filmography

References

External links
 Actors Comedy Studio

1968 births
Living people